Apoderinae is a subfamily of leaf rolling weevils in the beetle family Attelabidae. There are at least 20 genera and more than 650 described species in Apoderinae, found in Europe, Asia, and Africa.

Genera
These genera belong to the subfamily Apoderinae:

 Agomadaranus Voss, 1958
 Allapoderus Voss, 1927
 Apoderus Olivier 1807
 Centrocorynus Jekel, 1860
 Compsapoderus Voss, 1927
 Cycnotrachelodus
 Cycnotrachelus Jekel, 1860
 Hoplapoderus Jekel, 1860
 Korotyaevirhinus Legalov, 2003
 Leptapoderus Jekel, 1860
 Paracycnotrachelus Voss, 1924
 Paratrachelophorus Voss, 1924
 Paroplapoderus Voss, 1926
 Phymatapoderus Voss, 1926
 Pseudallapoderus Legalov, 2003
 Pseudotrachelophorus Legalov, 2007
 Strigapoderopsis
 Strigapoderus Jekel, 1860
 Tomapoderus Voss, 1926
 Trachelophorus Jekel, 1860

References

Weevils
Beetle subfamilies